Adiós, muchachos (English language: Goodbye, boys) is a 1955 Argentine film directed by Armando Bo and written by Rafael García Ibáñez. The film starred Pola Alonso and Arturo Arcari.

Cast
 Pola Alonso
 Arturo Arcari
 Héctor Armendáriz
 Lina Bardo
 Alfredo Dalton
 Juancito Díaz
 Francisco Pablo Donadio
 Rolando Dumas
 Carlos A. Dusso
 José María Fra
 Arturo Huber
 Jorge Leval
 Eugenio Novile
 Juan Carlos Prevende
 Virginia Romay
 Marcelo Ruggero
 Héctor Silva
 Silvia Sisley
 José Soriano
 Osvaldo Tempore
 Mateo Velich

External links
 

1955 films
1950s Spanish-language films
Argentine black-and-white films
1950s Argentine films